The 3rd IAAF World Athletics Final was held at the Stade Louis II, in Monte Carlo, Monaco on September 9, and September 10, 2005.

The hammer throw event for men and women had to take place in Szombathely, Hungary  on September 3 as the Monaco stadium was not large enough to hold the event.

Medal summary

Men

Women

See also
2005 in athletics (track and field)

References

External links
Official 3rd IAAF World Athletics Final Site

World Athletics Final
World Athletics Final
World Athletics Final
2005
International athletics competitions hosted by Hungary
International athletics competitions hosted by Monaco